Ryoji Nakata (中田 亮二, born November 3, 1987 in Japan) is a Japanese former professional baseball first baseman who played for the Chunichi Dragons in Japan's Nippon Professional Baseball from 2010 to 2014.

External links

1987 births
Living people
Japanese baseball players
Nippon Professional Baseball infielders
Chunichi Dragons players